Marion Speed Boyd (September 12, 1900 – January 9, 1988) was a United States district judge of the United States District Court for the Western District of Tennessee.

Education and career

Born in Covington, Tennessee, Boyd received a Bachelor of Laws from the University of Tennessee College of Law in 1921 and entered private practice in Memphis, Tennessee. He was a member of the Tennessee House of Representatives from 1925 to 1927, and was then an assistant state attorney general of Shelby County, Tennessee until 1935. He served in the Tennessee Senate in 1935, and was then a Referee in Bankruptcy for the United States District Court for the Western District of Tennessee from 1935 to 1937. He was a Judge of the City Court of Memphis from 1937 to 1938, and state attorney general of Shelby County from 1940 to 1961.

Federal judicial service

On September 13, 1940, Boyd was nominated by President Franklin D. Roosevelt to a seat on the United States District Court for the Western District of Tennessee vacated by Judge John Donelson Martin Sr. Boyd was confirmed by the United States Senate on September 18, 1940, and received his commission on September 27, 1940. He served as a member of the Judicial Conference of the United States from 1960 to 1963, and as Chief Judge from 1961 to 1966, assuming senior status on August 1, 1966 and continuing in that capacity until his death on January 9, 1988.

Notable cases 
Boyd confirmed the death sentence of Clyde Arwood in January 1942, Tennessee's only federal death sentence.

See also
 List of United States federal judges by longevity of service

References

Sources
 

1900 births
1988 deaths
Members of the Tennessee House of Representatives
Tennessee state senators
Judges of the United States District Court for the Western District of Tennessee
United States district court judges appointed by Franklin D. Roosevelt
20th-century American judges
University of Tennessee College of Law alumni
People from Covington, Tennessee
People from Shelby County, Tennessee
20th-century American politicians